The Danmarks Flymuseum is a museum located at Stauning Airport in Stauning, Denmark.

It has a collection of around 70 aircraft from the period 1911 until 2000. Around 60 aircraft are on display. The collection includes gliders, fighter planes and helicopters. Many are still airworthy.

The collection is considered part of Denmark's Air Force Museum as it hosts the collection of the Royal Danish Air Force.

The museum has a restoration department which restores and maintains aircraft.

Stauning Airport is also home of a yearly vintage aircraft rally.

References

External links

 

Museums with year of establishment missing
Air force museums
Military and war museums in Denmark
Ringkøbing-Skjern Municipality